Rod Derline (born March 11, 1952) is a former professional basketball guard for the Seattle SuperSonics of the National Basketball Association (NBA).

Amateur career
Derline played high school basketball at Elma High School in Elma, Washington, leading the Eagles to the Class A state championship game in 1970. He then played college basketball at Seattle University. He was inducted into Seattle University's basketball hall of fame in 2003.

NBA career
The Seattle SuperSonics chose Derline in the tenth round of the 1974 NBA Draft, with the 169th overall pick. Despite his low draft position, Derline made the team, and played two seasons for the SuperSonics until a knee injury ended his career. In 107 total NBA games, Derline averaged 4.8 points per game.

References

1952 births
Living people
American men's basketball players
Basketball players from Washington (state)
Guards (basketball)
People from Elma, Washington
Seattle Redhawks men's basketball players
Seattle SuperSonics draft picks
Seattle SuperSonics players